Fantasy World is an unfinished theme park in Lemery, Batangas, Philippines. With no operational rides, the site functions as a photo park.

History
Fantasy World was initially intended to be a members-only club but was changed into a resort-theme park open to tourists coming from Metro Manila and Calabarzon. It received an endorsement from the Department of Tourism in 1997. Land acquisition started in January 1999 while site development began in October with ECE Realty & Development Inc. as the project's initial developer. In 2001, it was granted pioneer incentives by the Board of Investments.

It was touted to be the "DisneyWorld of the Philippines" and was envisioned to dwarf Enchanted Kingdom. The project was expected to cost  and was to be fully operational by 2005. However, due to financial issues and illness of ECE Realty head Emilio Ching, development of Fantasy World halted in the mid-2000s.

Fantasy World was then open to the public in the early 2010s as a site for photoshoots. The site then was bought by new owners.

Facilities

There are rides installed within the park, but none are operational. A Bavarian-inspired castle serves as the centerpiece of Fantasy World. Originally there was a plan to build a 504-room hotel within the theme park's vicinity as well as other facilities for recreation and leisure.

In popular culture
GMA's 2006 television series Majika was filmed at Fantasy World. Likewise some scenes of Fantastica of Star Cinema and Viva Films were shot at the theme park.

References

Amusement parks in the Philippines
Buildings and structures in Batangas
Unfinished buildings and structures